Victor R. Ramirez (born July 20, 1974) is a former state delegate and state senator for District 47 in Prince George's County, Maryland. He was born in San Salvador, El Salvador, in 1974. His family soon after moved to the United States and he lived in Mount Rainier, Maryland.

Education

Ramirez attended Mt. Rainier and Thomas S. Stone Elementary, Hyattsville Middle School, and graduated from Northwestern High School. He received his B.A. from Frostburg State University in 1996 and his J.D from St. Thomas School of Law in Miami in 2001.

Career

Ramirez was admitted to the Maryland Bar in 2001 and began a practice in his own name. He was elected to the Maryland House of Delegates in November 2002, becoming with Ana Sol Gutierrez, who was elected at the same time, the first Latinos elected to the Maryland State House.

In the legislature
Ramirez was a member of House of Delegates from 2003 to 2011 and a member of the Joint Committee on Federal Relations and the Special Committee on Higher Education Affordability and Accessibility (2003–2004). Ramirez served as a member of the Ways and Means Committee (2003–2006) and the Ways and Mean's subcommittee on education (2003–2004).
 
 Ramirez has a Chair on the Law Enforcement and State-Appointed Boards Committees.
 Ramirez has served in the Prince George's County Delegation (from 2007 vice-chair, 2003–2006).
 Ramirez is a Member of the Maryland Educators Caucus (from 2005) and the Maryland Veterans Caucus (from 2005).

In January 2007 he proposed a bill that would allow undocumented immigrants to attend public colleges and universities at the in-state tuition rate.

In 2010 Ramirez defeated the incumbent senator from district 47.

Democratic Party activist
During the 2008 democratic presidential primary, Ramirez endorsed the campaign of Illinois Senator Barack Obama and was co-founder of Latinos for Obama in Maryland.

Legislative notes
 voted in favor of Maryland gas tax increase
 voted for the Healthy Air Act in 2006 (SB154)
 voted against slots in 2005 (HB1361)
 voted in favor of in-state tuition for undocumented immigrants in 2007 (HB6)
 voted in favor of the Tax Reform Act of 2007(HB2)

2018 state's attorney race
Rather than seek reelection to the Senate in 2018, Ramirez ran for Prince George's County state's attorney, losing in the Democratic primary with 27 percent of the vote total.

2022 county council race
Ramirez announced in March 2021 that he would run for an open seat on the Prince George's County Council from district 2. He lost in the Democratic primary to Wanika Fisher, 50.9% to 44.8%.

Past elections
2006 race for Maryland House of Delegates – 47th district
Voters to choose three:
{| class="wikitable"
|-
!Name
!Votes
!Percent
!Outcome
|-
|- 
|Jolene Ivey, Democratic
|12,860
|  35.5%
|   Won
|-
|- 
|Victor R. Ramirez, Democratic
|12,231 
|  33.6%
|   Won
|-
|- 
|Doyle L. Niemann, Democratic
|11,229
|  30.8%
|   Won
|-
|- 
|Other write-ins
|120
|  .3%
|   
|-
|}

References

External links
 

1974 births
Salvadoran emigrants to the United States
Democratic Party members of the Maryland House of Delegates
Frostburg State University alumni
Hispanic and Latino American state legislators in Maryland
American politicians of Salvadoran descent
People from Mount Rainier, Maryland
People from San Salvador
Living people
21st-century American politicians